Redi is a village in the district of Sindhudurg in Maharashtra. Originally known as Rewati, Redi is located close to the shores of the Arabian Sea. Cashew and coconut trees grow in the region.

The village belongs to the Vengurla Taluka of the Konkan region and was a significant sea port during the earlier times. Redi has now evolved into a tourist hub because of its long virgin and unspoiled beaches alongside archaic historic monuments like the Yashwantgad Fort. Redi is merely 566 km away from Mumbai and can be easily reached.

History
Redi was built by the Marathas in the sixteenth century and, in 1746, was captured by the Portuguese. The previous citadel-holders, the Sawant clan of Maharashtra, attempted to recapture Redi by poisoning the Portuguese garrison's fish supply, but the attack was unsuccessful.

Redi was eventually returned to the Sawants following a peace treaty, but the peace was short-lived; in 1765 the fort was captured by the British who  sold the land to local people in 1890 while retaining ownership of the Redi fort walls.

Geography
Areas included are Kanyal, Gavtale, Bomdojichiwadi, Varchiker. The nearest town to the village, Shiroda, is. away.

Landmarks
The Swayambhu Shiv Temple, the Ganesha Temple, the Mauli Temple, the Rampurush Temple and the Navadurga Temple – where Goddess Durga is worshipped - are located in Red. The Yashwantgad Fort, Shiroda, Aravali and the Terekhol Fort are local historic monuments.

Climate
Redi features a tropical monsoon climate, and is warm throughout the year.

Language 
Malvani is spoken as a local language. Marathi, the state language, is also understood and implemented.

Culture

Festivals
Ganesh Chaturthi is the biggest festival in the village. Being the place of one of Maharashtra's Ganesh temples, Ganesh Chaturthi has an important place in people's lives. In Redi, most Hindu families install their own small clay statues for worship on Ganesh Chaturthi. The idol is worshiped every morning and evening until the "departure". The daily worship ceremonies end with the worshipers singing the Aarti in honor of Ganesh, other Gods and saints by visiting each one's home in the village who has ongoing celebrations. As per the tradition of their respective families, the domestic celebrations come to an end after 1, 3, 5, 7, 11 or 21 days when the statue is taken in a procession to the Arabian Sea for immersion.

Cuisine
Cuisine covers a range from mild to very spicy dishes. Rice, vegetables, lentils and fruit are staple foods. Popular dishes include fish curry and rice. Meals (mainly lunch and dinner) are served on a plate called thali or occasionally on Patravali or Banana leaf. Each food item served on the thali has a specific place. In some households, meals begin with a thanksgiving offering of food (Naivedya) to the household Gods. The cuisine is of Maharashtrian-Goan type called Malvani (Konkani). There is extensive use of seafood and coconut, as it is locally available. The staple foods of the Konkani people are rice and fish.

Transport
Redi is connected to other parts of Maharashtra state by MSRTC buses. Local sharing rickshaw, known as six-seaters in the region, are used widely by the people and connect smaller places. Redi port is also used for water transport of iron and manganese ore.

Villages in Sindhudurg district